OLW could refer to:

 Centennial Station, Olympia, Washington, United States; Amtrak station code OLW
 Office Live Workspace The online collaboration tool.
 Oldham Werneth railway station, England; National Rail station code OLW
 Industry Loss Warranties or Original Loss Warranty
 Our Lady of Walsingham
 , a Swedish snack producer, formerly Old London Wasa
 Open Live Writer Desktop blog-publishing application.